Nicholas Gillingham,  (born 22 January 1967) is an English former competitive swimmer, active in the 1980's and 1990's. Born in Walsall, he represented Great Britain in the Olympics, FINA World championships and European championships, as well as representing  England in the Commonwealth Games. Medalling in two Olympic Games in 1988 and 1992, he was a World (short course), European and Commonwealth champion in his specialist event, the 200 metres breaststroke. His career broadly overlapped with fellow British breaststroker and Olympic 100 metre breaststroke champion, Adrian Moorhouse.

Swimming career

Olympic Games
Gillingham participated in three consecutive Summer Olympics, starting in 1988. At the 1988 Summer Olympics in Seoul, he won the silver medal in the 200-metre breaststroke in a Commonwealth record of 2:14.12, followed by a bronze medal in the same event four years later at the 1992 Summer Olympics in Barcelona in another Commonwealth record of 2:11.29. Although better known as a 200m breaststroke swimmer, Gillingham was also a world class 100m swimmer and was ranked first in the world in 1992 with his Commonwealth record of 1:01.33 from the British Olympic trials. However, he sustained a leg injury during the Olympics which impaired his performance in the 100m final where he finished 7th, half a second slower than his heat time.

Commonwealth Games
Gillingham won seven Commonwealth Games medals; he represented England and won a silver medal in the 4 x 100 metres medley relay and a bronze medal in the 200 metres breaststroke, at the 1986 Commonwealth Games in Edinburgh, Scotland. Four years later he represented England and won two bronze medals in the 100 metres and 200 metres breaststroke, at the 1990 Commonwealth Games in Auckland, New Zealand. At the 1994 Commonwealth Games he won the gold medal in the 200 metres breaststroke, the silver medal in the 100 metres breaststroke and a bronze medal in medley relay.

Other
In August 1989 in the European Championships, he equalled the existing world record in the long-course 200-metre breaststroke in a time of 2:12.90, only to co-hold it for a single day before the other record co-holder, American Mike Barrowman, lowered the record again.

He was trained by Tim Jones and also won the world title at the first inaugural 1993 FINA Short Course World Championships in Palma de Mallorca. He broke three world, ten European, nine Commonwealth and seventeen British records during his career and won 17 major championships.

He dominated the ASA National Championships in the breaststroke events, following on from his predecessor Adrian Moorhouse and won the  100 metres breaststroke title in 1992 and 1993  and the 200 metres breaststroke on eight occasions (1987, 1988, 1989, 1990, 1991, 1992, 1993 and 1995).

Personal life
Gillingham was awarded the MBE in 1993 for 'services to swimming' and retired from full-time competitive sport in 1996. After retiring, he established a sports communications business focusing on sports marketing, development & events. Recently, Gillingham took part in a scheme called Young Ambassadors, promoting youth sport development in the North East of England at Loughborough.

See also
 List of Commonwealth Games medallists in swimming (men)
 List of Olympic medalists in swimming (men)
 World record progression 200 metres breaststroke

References

External links
 Profile Nick Gillingham

1967 births
Living people
Sportspeople from Walsall
English male swimmers
Olympic swimmers of Great Britain
Swimmers at the 1988 Summer Olympics
Swimmers at the 1992 Summer Olympics
Swimmers at the 1996 Summer Olympics
Swimmers at the 1986 Commonwealth Games
Swimmers at the 1990 Commonwealth Games
Swimmers at the 1994 Commonwealth Games
Olympic silver medallists for Great Britain
Olympic bronze medallists for Great Britain
Members of the Order of the British Empire
Commonwealth Games gold medallists for England
Commonwealth Games silver medallists for England
Commonwealth Games bronze medallists for England
World record setters in swimming
Olympic bronze medalists in swimming
World Aquatics Championships medalists in swimming
Medalists at the FINA World Swimming Championships (25 m)
European Aquatics Championships medalists in swimming
Medalists at the 1992 Summer Olympics
Medalists at the 1988 Summer Olympics
Olympic silver medalists in swimming
Commonwealth Games medallists in swimming
Medallists at the 1986 Commonwealth Games
Medallists at the 1990 Commonwealth Games
Medallists at the 1994 Commonwealth Games